Bob Callahan (1937–2020) was a Canadian politician. Robert Callahan may also refer to:

Bob Callahan (American football) (1923–2011), American football player
Robert J. Callahan (1930–2013), Connecticut Supreme Court justice

See also
Robert O'Callaghan (1777–1840), British Army officer and politician